Portero may refer to:

 Concierge in Spanish
 Goalkeeper in Spanish